Charinidae is an arachnid family within the order of tailless whip scorpions. The family is monophyletic and contains three genera: Weygoldtia is sister to a monophyletic group comprising Charinus and Sarax, neither of which are reciprocally monophyletic.

Genera
There are three genera in the family Charinidae.
Charinus Simon, 1892
Sarax Simon, 1892
Weygoldtia Miranda, Giupponi, Prendini & Scharff, 2018

References

External links

 ITIS
 Australian Faunal Directory

Amblypygi
Arachnid families